The former Isanti County Courthouse, located at  237 2nd Avenue, South West, corner of Birch Street, in Cambridge, Minnesota, United States, is an historic two-story redbrick county courthouse built in 1888. Today it is known as Court House Square and has been remodeled into a private office building.

On July 24, 1980, it was added to the National Register of Historic Places.

The current county courthouse is located at 555 18th Avenue, South West.

References

Buildings and structures in Isanti County, Minnesota
County courthouses in Minnesota
Courthouses on the National Register of Historic Places in Minnesota
National Register of Historic Places in Isanti County, Minnesota
Cambridge, Minnesota
Former courthouses in Minnesota